Garou is the third studio album recorded by the Canadian singer Garou, and his fourth album overall.

Track listing
"Le temps nous aime" (Jacques Veneruso) — 3:26
"Je suis le même" (Tino Izzo, Diane Cadieux) — 3:29
"Plus fort que moi" (Frédéric Doll, David Gategno) — 3:01
"L'injustice" (Pascal Obispo) — 5:17
"Que le temps" (Sandrine Roy, Sylvain Michel) — 3:58
"Même par amour" (Patrice Guirao, Pascal Obispo) — 3:24
"Dis que tu me retiendras" (Diane Cadieux, Tino Izzo) — 3:37
"Trahison" (Aldo Nova, Johan Bobäck, Joachim Nilsson, Luc Plamondon) — 3:58
"Milliers de pixels" (Tino Izzo, Diane Cadieux) — 3:33
"Je suis debout"  (Jacques Veneruso) — 3:26
"Viens me chercher" (Jean-Jacques Goldman, Jacques Veneruso) — 3:32
"Quand je manque de toi" (Jacques Veneruso) — 3:29

Certifications

References

2006 albums
Garou (singer) albums
Sony Music Canada albums